James Hamilton "Ham" Dowling (November 12, 1895 – January 28, 1986) was a college football player and once chief engineer of the Florida State Highway Commission.

University of Florida
Dowling played for the Florida Gators of the University of Florida in 1915.

Georgia Tech
He then transferred to the Georgia Institute of Technology and played for John Heisman's Georgia Tech Golden Tornado. He was a member of the ANAK Society and Alpha Tau Omega fraternity.

1917
Dowling was a member of Georgia Tech's first national championship team in 1917, which outscored opponents 491 to 17.

Florida State Highway Commission
He was once appointed chief engineer of the Florida State Highway Commission in 1933, and served in that capacity until 1946. He was again chief engineer in 1954.

References

Bibliography

External links

 

1895 births
1986 deaths
American football tackles
Florida Gators football players
Georgia Tech Yellow Jackets football players
All-Southern college football players
Players of American football from Savannah, Georgia
American football guards